The only Bavarian Class Gts 4/4 locomotive in the Royal Bavarian State Railways (Königlich Bayerische Staatsbahn) was built in 1909 for the meter gauge line between Eichstätt and Kinding. 

The four coupled axles were very close together, so that tight curves could be negotiated. The centre axles were installed with side play, which meant the connecting rod had to drive the fourth axle. The wheelbase was only 2.6 metres and, with the overall length of the locomotive being almost 8.5 metres, it had very long overhangs. The result was a relatively rough ride.

A striking feature was the very large size of the driver's cab. The locomotive frame was designed as a water tank, and on the steam dome was a safety valve protected by a housing. The engine carried 2.2 m3 of water and 1.2 tonnes of coal.

The locomotive was mainly used in rollbock services between Eichstätt and a quarry. After the formation of the Deutsche Reichsbahn it was taken over and grouped as DRG Class 99.15 with the number 99 151. The engine was retired in 1935, after the conversion of the route to standard gauge.

See also 
List of Bavarian locomotives and railbuses
Bavarian branch lines

Sources 

 
 

0-8-0T locomotives
Gts 4 4
Metre gauge steam locomotives
Narrow gauge steam locomotives of Germany
Railway locomotives introduced in 1909
Krauss locomotives
D n2t locomotives
Freight locomotives